Farrandsville is an unincorporated community in Colebrook Township in Clinton County in the U.S. state of Pennsylvania. Whisky Run and Lick Run flow through Farrandsville.

History
The community was named for William P. Farrand, a representative of the Lycoming Coal Company. He founded the village in 1832. Two years later, the West Branch Canal was completed to Farrandsville, giving the village access to supplies and markets by canal boat. The village became the northern terminus of the canal, which was never extended further upstream. During this era, a steamboat named Farrand operated on the West Branch Susquehanna River on the pool of water behind the Dunnstown Dam at Lock Haven. It made regular trips as far upstream as Farrandsville.

In 1836, a group of investors from Boston financed construction of a blast furnace at the village site. Coke made from bituminous coal from a nearby mine fueled the furnace, which used hot blast technology that was new at the time. The furnace produced  of iron a week, second only to the Lonaconing Furnace in Maryland.

The cost of obtaining ore as well as limestone needed during the smelting process was high. This cost, combined with lower income during the Panic of 1837, led to closure of the furnace in 1838.

Despite the furnace shutdown, other industries thrived in Farrandsville through the first decades of the 20th century. Businesses included a fire brick company, a cigar company, and lumber mills. Harbison-Walker Refractories Company of Pittsburgh bought the brickworks in 1902 and continued operations there until 1925. In 1951, the company gave the iron furnace to the Clinton County Historical Society.

References

Unincorporated communities in Pennsylvania
Unincorporated communities in Clinton County, Pennsylvania